Yunak is a village in the municipality of Avren, in Varna Province, northeastern Bulgaria.

Honours
Yunak Peak on Brabant Island, Antarctica is named after the village.

References

Villages in Varna Province